Schachen (Gais) railway station is a railway station in Gais, in the Swiss canton of Appenzell Ausserrhoden. It is an intermediate stop on the  Altstätten–Gais line and is served by local trains only.

Services 
Schachen (Gais) is served by the S24 of the St. Gallen S-Bahn:

 : hourly service between Gais and Altstätten Stadt.

References

External links 
 Schachen (Gais) station on SBB

Railway stations in the canton of Appenzell Ausserrhoden
Appenzell Railways stations